Noall Thurber Wootton was the Utah County District Attorney, in Utah, from 1974 to 1986. During his time in that role, he is most famous for being the lead prosecutor of Gary Gilmore, the first person to be executed after the 1976 reinstatement of the death penalty. Wootton earned his bachelor's degree from Brigham Young University in 1961 and a JD from the University of Utah in 1964. Noall Wootton died at the age of 65 on  due to cancer.

Noall Wootton is buried next to his wife Nancy Crocker Wootton at American Fork Cemetery in his hometown of American Fork, Utah.

Portrayal
In 1980, Norman Mailer wrote The Executioner's Song about the events of the Gary Gilmore trial. Two years later, in 1982, a television adaption was made. In the film, Wootton was portrayed by Charles Cyphers.

References

1940 births
2006 deaths
Brigham Young University alumni
Deaths from cancer in Utah
District attorneys in Utah
People from American Fork, Utah
S.J. Quinney College of Law alumni